The Glendale News Press is a weekly newspaper published by Outlook Newspapers Group in Glendale, California. It covers local news, community events,  and sports in Glendale and La Crescenta-Montrose.

History
The paper was founded as a weekly, The Glendale News, on May 1, 1905, by E. M. McClure and J. F. Boughton.  McClure bought out Boughton in fall, 1905, then sold the paper on January 1, 1907 to E. B. Riggs and J. C. Sherer.  The News published continuously until August 23, 1913, competing against the weekly Glendale Press founded in 1910.   When the Glendale Press converted to daily publication on March 1, 1921, the city found itself with two daily newspapers.

As part of a complex transaction involving several other Southern California newspapers, Ira Clifton Copley's Copley Press bought and combined the Glendale Daily Press and the Glendale Evening News seven years later, issuing the first edition of the consolidated Glendale News-Press on February 15, 1928.  The Glendale News-Press became part of Copley's Southern California Associated Newspapers, comprising eight daily newspapers in Los Angeles County.

Copley sold the News Press and the Burbank Daily Review to Morris Newspapers in 1974; however Morris sold off the papers two years later. Ingersoll Publications bought the papers in 1980.

Page Group Publishing, owners of the Orange Coast Daily Pilot and the Huntington Beach Independent, acquired the paper from Ingersoll in 1989. Times Mirror bought the newspaper group in 1993.  Following continued declines in circulation and advertising, the paper reduced its printing schedule to five days, then four, then weekly.

On April 18, 2020, its closure was announced by the Los Angeles Times, but then was bought by the Outlook Newspaper Group.

References

External links

Newspapers published in Greater Los Angeles
Glendale, California
Mass media in Los Angeles County, California
Tribune Publishing
Weekly newspapers published in California